Kannur Sreelatha is an Indian actress from Kannur who is best known for her work in Malayalam cinema. Making her debut with the movie Prashnam Gurutharam, directed by Balachandra Menon, she has acted in many stage plays before entering into the film field.

Personal life
Sreelatha is the eldest of four children born to theater artists Rajan, and Vasanthy, at Muzhappilangattu, Kannur, Kerala. She has two brothers and a sister. Her father owned a drama troupe, Raja Theaters, in which she and her mother used to act, before she later went on to act in other drama troupes like Alavil Deshiya Kalasamithi at the age of 13. Her education came from Kannur Girls High School.

Sreelatha is married to Vinod; they have no children.  As well as appearing in many films over the course of thirty years, she is also acting in Tele films and soap operas. Currently Sreelatha resides at Pallikkunnu, Kannur with family.

Awards
 1981–1982 Kerala State Theater Artist Award for the drama Nandi Veendum Varika
 Nana Television Best Actress Award

Filmography

 Sukheshettanu Pennu Kittunnilla
 Urava 
 Mathilakam
 Ka
 Parppidam
 Thaniyye
 Chatmates as Amina
 Neela Chela as Myili
 Vellam (2021)
 Muttayi Kallanum Mammaliyum (2019)
 Peythozhinju 
 Ende Vellithooval (2016)
 Pravasalokam (2016) as Subaidha's mother
 Nikhah (2015) as Khadeeja
 Love Land (2015) as Raman's wife
 The Reporter (2015) as Mother Superior
 To Noora with Love (2014) as Nun
 Pedithondan (2014)
 Swaha (2014) as Sreedevi's mother
 Ivan Megharoopan (2012) as Padmavthi
 Mukham Moodikal (2012) as Devakiyamma
 Njaan Sanchaari (2010)
 Bhoomi Malayalam (2009)
 Meghatheertham (2009)
 Swapnangalil Haisel Mary (2008)
 Ullam (2005)
 Agninakshathram (2004) as Village lady
 Kusruthy (2004) as Pearly
 Masangudi Mannadiyar Speaking (2004)
 Ee Snehatheerathu(2004) as Gayathri's mother
 Gaurisankaram (2003)
 Melvilaasam Shariyaanu (2003) as Nandakumar's mother
 Shinkari Bolona (2003)
 War & Love (2003) as Omana
 Thaamara (2003) as Thaamara's  mother
 Malsaram (2003)
 Ente Ammakku (2003)
 Neelakasham Niraye (2002) as Sainabha
 Grand Mother (2002)
 Pakalppooram (2002)
 Chithrathoonukal (2001) as Ranjith's mother
 Chandanamarangal (2001) as Shesha Iyer's wife
 Naranathu Thampuran (2001)
 Uthaman (2001)
 Nalacharitham Naalam Divasam (2001) as Pushpan's wife
 Swayamvarappanthal (2000) as Malathy
 Deepasthambham Mahascharyam (2000)
 Pattaabhishekam (1999) as Bhanu
 Ustaad (1999)
 Mimics Ghost (1999)
 Garshom (1999)
 Kannezhuthi Pottum Thottu(1999) as Rosakutty
 Ayal Kathayezhuthukayannu (1999) as Priya's valiyamma
 Njangal Santhushtaranu(1999)
 Malabaril Ninnoru Manimaaran (1998) as Damayanthi
 Harthal (1998)
 British Market (1998)
 Kalaapam (1998)
 Kottaram Veettile Apputtan(1998) as Sarojini
 Ilamura Thamburan (1998) as Vilasini
 Panchaloham (1998)
 Sammaanam (1997) as Aminamma
 Snehasindooram (1997)
 The Good Boys (1997)
 Snehadoothu (1997)
 Kilikurissiyile Kudumbamela (1997) as Alice
 Mr.Clean (1996) as Nurse
 Hitler Brothers (1996)
 Rajakeeyam (1995)
 Ithrayum Kaalam (1987) as Sreedevi
 Neram Pularumbol (1987)
 Meenamaasathile Sooryan (1986) as Kalyani
 Ee Shabdham Ennathe Shabdham (1986)
 Irakal (1986) as Roslin
 Chekkeranoru Chilla (1986) as Sujatha
 Katha Ithuvare (1985) as Sheela
 Onathumbikkoroonjal (1985) 
 Oru Nokku Kanan (1985) as Rajani
 Punnaaram Chollicholli (1985)
 Muhoortham 11:30 (1985) as Reetha
 Thammil Thammil (1985) as Sunitha
 Manyamahajanangale (1985)
 Aarorumariyaathe (1984)
 Veendum Chalikkunna Chakram (1984) as Joseph's sister
 Appunni (1984)
 Sandarbham (1984) as Dr. Rachel
 Enganeyundashane (1984) as Alice
 April 18 (1984) as Elsy
 Ente Upasana (1984) as Sreekumar's wife
 Kanamarayathu (1984) as Sreedevi
 Prasnam Gurutharam (1983) as Balu's Murapennu
 Naseema (1983)
 Snehasammanam (1982)

Television career
 Karthika (Doordarshan)
 Alakal  (Doordarshan)
 Sreeraman Sreedevi (Asianet)
 Snehanjali (Surya TV)
 Amma Manassu (Asianet)
 Minnukettu (Surya TV)
 Aalippazham (Surya TV)
 Melottu Pozhiyunna Ilakal
 Uthareeyam (Telefilm)
 Amrithavarshini (Telefilm)
 Sr.Maria Celine The Servant of God (Telefilm)
 Thacholi Kathayile Chappan
 Pakida Pakida Pambaram
 Kadavu
 Kalpitham
 Mayamadhavam (Surya TV)
 Mohakkadal (Surya TV)
 Rudraveena (Surya TV)
 Manthrakodi (Asianet)
 Chodyam Utharam
 Nonachi Paru (Asianet)
 Amma Maanasam (Asianet)
 Ival Yamuna (Mazhavil Manorama)
 Daya (Kairali TV)
 Nirapara (Advertisement)

Dramas
Iniyum Unarathavar
Nandi Veendum Varika

Radio
 Ezhuthupetty

References

External links

Actresses in Malayalam cinema
Actresses in Tamil cinema
Indian film actresses
Actresses from Kannur
Living people
Year of birth missing (living people)
Indian television actresses
20th-century Indian actresses
21st-century Indian actresses
Actresses in Malayalam television